Nychioptera accola is a species of moth in the family Erebidae first described by John G. Franclemont in 1966. It is found in North America.

The MONA or Hodges number for Nychioptera accola is 8486.

References

Further reading

 
 
 

Boletobiinae
Articles created by Qbugbot
Moths described in 1966